Ocimum  is a genus of aromatic annual and perennial herbs and shrubs in the family Lamiaceae, native to the tropical and warm temperate regions of all 6 inhabited continents, with the greatest number of species in Africa. It is the genus of basil and the name is from the Ancient Greek word for basil, . Its best known species are the cooking herb great basil, O. basilicum, and the medicinal herb tulsi (holy basil), O. tenuiflorum.

Ecology
Ocimum species are used as food plants by the larvae of some Lepidoptera species including Endoclita malabaricus.

Taxonomy

Species 
Known Ocimum species include:
 Ocimum americanum L. (tropical Africa), Indian Subcontinent, China, Southeast Asia; naturalized in Queensland, Christmas Island, and parts of tropical America
Ocimum amicorum A.J.Paton - Tanzania
Ocimum angustifolium Benth. - southeastern Africa from Kenya to Tranasvaal
 Ocimum basilicum L. – Basil, Sweet basil - China, Indian Subcontinent, Southeast Asia; naturalized in Russia, Ukraine, Africa, Mexico, Central America, South America, and various oceanic islands
Ocimum burchellianum Benth. - Cape Province of South Africa
 Ocimum campechianum Mill. – Amazonian basil - widespread across Florida, Mexico, West Indies, Central and South America
Ocimum canescens A.J.Paton - Tanzania
Ocimum carnosum (Spreng.) Link & Otto ex Benth. - Mexico, South America
 Ocimum centraliafricanum R.E.Fr - Zaïre, Tanzania, Zambia, Zimbabwe 
Ocimum circinatum A.J.Paton - Ethiopia, Somalia
Ocimum coddii (S.D.Williams & K.Balkwill) A.J.Paton - Northern Province of South Africa
Ocimum cufodontii (Lanza) A.J.Paton - Ethiopia, Somalia, Kenya
Ocimum dambicola A.J.Paton  - Tanzania, Zambia
Ocimum decumbens Gürke - from Zaïre to South Africa
Ocimum dhofarense (Sebald) A.J.Paton  - Oman
Ocimum dolomiticola A.J.Paton - Northern Province of South Africa
Ocimum ellenbeckii Gürke - Ethiopia, Zaïre
Ocimum empetroides (P.A.Duvign.) ined. - Zaïre
Ocimum ericoides (P.A.Duvign. & Plancke) A.J.Paton - Zaïre
Ocimum filamentosum Forssk. - eastern + southern Africa, Arabian Peninsula, India, Sri Lanka, Myanmar
Ocimum fimbriatum Briq. - central Africa
Ocimum fischeri Gürke - Kenya, Tanzania
Ocimum formosum Gürke - Bale Province of Ethiopia
Ocimum forskolei Benth. - eastern Africa from Egypt to Kenya, Angola, Arabian Peninsula
Ocimum fruticosum (Ryding) A.J.Paton - Somalia
Ocimum grandiflorum Lam. - Kenya, Tanzania, Ethiopia
Ocimum gratissimum L. – African basil - Africa, Madagascar, southern Asia, Bismarck Archipelago; naturalized in Polynesia, Mexico, Panama, West Indies, Brazil, Bolivia
Ocimum hirsutissimum (P.A.Duvign.) A.J.Paton - Zaïre
Ocimum irvinei J.K.Morton - West Africa
Ocimum jamesii Sebald - Ethiopia, Somalia
Ocimum kenyense Ayob. ex A.J.Paton - Kenya, Tanzania
 Ocimum kilimandscharicum Baker ex Gürke – Camphor basil - Kenya, Tanzania, Uganda, Sudan, Ethiopia; naturalized in Angola, India, Myanmar, Thailand
Ocimum labiatum (N.E.Br.) A.J.Paton - Mozambique, South Africa, Eswatini
Ocimum lamiifolium Hochst. ex Benth - eastern + central Africa
Ocimum masaiense Ayob. ex A.J.Paton - Ngong Hills in Kenya
Ocimum mearnsii (Ayob. ex Sebald) A.J.Paton - Kenya, Tanzania, Uganda
Ocimum metallorum (P.A.Duvign.) A.J.Paton - Zaïre
 Ocimum minimum L. - India, Sri Lanka
Ocimum minutiflorum (Sebald) A.J.Paton - eastern + central Africa
Ocimum mitwabense (Ayob.) A.J.Paton - Zaïre
Ocimum monocotyloides (Plancke ex Ayob.) A.J.Paton - Zaïre
Ocimum motjaneanum McCallum & K.Balkwill - Eswatini
Ocimum natalense Ayob. ex A.J.Paton - Mozambique, KwaZulu-Natal
Ocimum nudicaule Benth. - Brazil, Paraguay, Misiones Province of Argentina
Ocimum nummularia (S.Moore) A.J.Paton - Somalia
Ocimum obovatum E.Mey. ex Benth. - tropical Africa, Madagascar
Ocimum ovatum Benth. - Brazil, Paraguay, Uruguay, Argentina
Ocimum pseudoserratum (M.R.Ashby) A.J.Paton - Northern Province of South Africa
Ocimum pyramidatum (A.J.Paton) A.J.Paton - Tanzania
Ocimum reclinatum (S.D.Williams & M.Balkwill) A.J.Paton - Mozambique, KwaZulu-Natal
Ocimum serpyllifolium Forssk. - Somalia, Yemen, Saudi Arabia
Ocimum serratum (Schltr.) A.J.Paton - South Africa, Eswatini
Ocimum somaliense Briq. - Ethiopia
Ocimum spectabile (Gürke) A.J.Paton - Ethiopia, Tanzania, Kenya, Somalia
Ocimum spicatum Deflers - Ethiopia, Yemen, Kenya, Somalia
Ocimum tenuiflorum L. – Holy basil, tulsi - China, Indian Subcontinent, Southeast Asia, New Guinea, Queensland; naturalized in Kenya, Fiji, French Polynesia, West Indies, Venezuela
Ocimum transamazonicum C.Pereira - Brazil
Ocimum tubiforme (R.D.Good) A.J.Paton  - Northern Province of South Africa
Ocimum urundense Robyns & Lebrun - Burundi, Tanzania
Ocimum vandenbrandei (P.A.Duvign. & Plancke ex Ayob.) A.J.Paton  - Marungu Province in Zaïre 
Ocimum vanderystii (De Wild.) A.W.Hill. - Zaïre, Congo-Brazzaville, Angola, Zambia
Ocimum viphyense A.J.Paton - Malawi, Zambia
Ocimum waterbergense (S.D.Williams & K.Balkwill) A.J.Paton - Northern Province of South Africa

Hybrids
Ocimum × africanum Lour. - Africa, Madagascar, China, Indian Subcontinent, Indochina; naturalized in Guatemala, Chiapas, Netherlands Antilles, eastern Brazil
Ocimum × citriodorum (O. americanum × O. basilicum) – Lemon basil
Ocimum kilimandscharicum × basilicum 'Dark Opal' – African blue basil

Formerly placed here
Basilicum polystachyon (L.) Moench (as O. polystachyon L.)
Isodon inflexus (Thunb.) Kudô (as O. inflexum Thunb.)
Frankenia salina (Molina) I.M.Johnst. (as O. salinum Molina)
Mosla scabra (Thunb.) C.Y.Wu & H.W.Li (as O. punctulatum J.F.Gmel. and O. scabrum Thunb.)
Orthosiphon aristatus (Blume) Miq. (as O. aristatum Blume)
Perilla frutescens var. crispa (Thunb.) W.Deane (as O. crispum Thunb.)
Perilla frutescens var. frutescens (as O. frutescens L.)
Plectranthus scutellarioides (L.) R.Br. (as O. scutellarioides L.)

Cultivation and uses
Most culinary and ornamental basils are cultivars of Ocimum basilicum and there are many hybrids between species. Thai basil (O. basilicum var. thyrsiflora) is a common ingredient in Thai cuisine, with a strong flavour similar to aniseed, used to flavour Thai curries and stir-fries. Lemon basil (Ocimum × citriodorum) is a hybrid between O. americanum and O. basilicum. It is noted for its lemon flavour and used in cooking.

Holy basil or tulsi (O. tenuiflorum) is a sacred herb revered as dear to Vishnu in some sects of Vaishnavism. Tulsi is used in teas, healing remedies, and cosmetics in India, and it is also used in Thai cooking. Amazonian basil (O. campechianum) is a South American species often utilized in ayahuasca rituals for its smell which is said to help avoid bad visions. O. centraliafricanum is valued as an indicator species for the presence of copper deposits.

See also
 List of basil cultivars

References

 
Herbs
Lamiaceae genera
Taxa named by Carl Linnaeus